Jeremy Towns  (born March 9, 1989) is an American football Defensive Tackle who was a free agent before signing with the Washington Redskins the day before he was supposed to start medical school at the University of South Alabama. Towns deferred for 2 years to play in the NFL where he also played for the Philadelphia Eagles and finally the Buffalo Bills. After injuring his knees, Towns returned to the University of South Alabama to begin the first year of medical school.

Towns graduated in 2020 as an MD and began his residency in Emergency Medicine at the UAB Hospital where he will finish his residency in 2023.

References

External links
Career transactions 
Samford Bulldogs bio

Living people
1989 births
Players of American football from Birmingham, Alabama
American football defensive tackles
African-American players of American football
Samford Bulldogs football players
21st-century African-American sportspeople
20th-century African-American people